Ashraful Hoq Chowdhury ndu, afwc, psc, BCGM, BN is a rear admiral of the Bangladesh Navy and the incumbent director general of the Bangladesh Coast Guard. Prior to this appointment, he was the Commander of the Khulna Naval Area.

Military career 
Chowdhury joined the Bangladesh Navy in the executive branch on 1 January 1988. He completed the missile command and tactics course, a strategic studies course in China, a gunnery specialisation course in Pakistan, an armed forces war course at National Defence College in Bangladesh and combined forces maritime component commander flag officer course in United States Pacific Fleet headquarters. He is the Senate member of Bangabandhu Sheikh Mujibur Rahman Maritime University, Bangladesh. During his tenure in the Bangladesh Coast Guard, it received four 20-metre-long rescue boats with oil pollution control equipment supplied by Japan International Cooperation Agency (JICA).He appointed as DG Coast Guard on 24th August, 2021.

Personal life 
Ashraful Hoq Chowdhury is married to Muslima Chowdhury.

References 

Bangladesh Navy personnel
Bangladeshi Navy admirals
Year of birth missing (living people)
Living people
Director Generals of Bangladesh Coast Guard
National Defence College (Bangladesh) alumni